Shelby Airport may refer to:

 Shelby Airport in Shelby, Montana, United States (FAA: SBX)
 Shelby-Cleveland County Regional Airport in Shelby, North Carolina, United States (FAA: EHO)
 Shelby Community Airport in Shelby, Ohio, United States (FAA: 12G)

See also 
 Shelby County Airport (disambiguation)